Michaľany is a village and municipality in the Trebišov District in the Košice Region of south-eastern Slovakia.

History
In historical records the village was first mentioned in 1273.

Geography
The village lies at an altitude of 131 metres and covers an area of 8.152 km².
It has a population of about 1750 people.

Ethnicity
The village is about 95% Slovak, 3% Roma and 2% Hungarian.

Facilities
The village has a public library a gym and a football pitch

External links
https://web.archive.org/web/20071116010355/http://www.statistics.sk/mosmis/eng/run.html

Villages and municipalities in Trebišov District